Moroccan settlers refers to citizens of the Kingdom of Morocco of various ethnicities that have settled in Western Sahara. Following the 1975 Green March, on the course of Western Sahara conflict, the Moroccan state has sponsored settlement schemes enticing thousands of Moroccans to move into the Moroccan-occupied part of Western Sahara (80% of the Western Sahara territory). By 2015, it was estimated that Moroccan settlers made up at least two thirds of the 500,000 inhabitants in the Western Sahara region.

Under international law, Morocco's transfer of its own civilians into occupied territory is in direct violation of Article 49 of the Fourth Geneva Convention (cf. Israeli and Turkish settlers).

History 
Western Sahara came under Spanish rule as a protectorate in 1884, wherein the territory extended from Cape Bojador to Cape Blanc. Spain gradually extended its control over the region over the next 40 years by negotiating with France. Spanish Sahara was formally established in 1958 after two earlier administrative districts, Río de Oro and Saguia el Hamra, were combined.

Amid pressure from nationalists in Spanish Sahara, Morocco, Mauritania, and Algeria, Spain disengaged from Western Sahara in 1976. The remaining territory was divided between Morocco and Mauritania, frustrating Algerian leaders and prompting them to begin supporting a Sahrawi nationalist group, the Polisario Front. In the late 1970s, the group began conducting guerrilla warfare in Morocco and Mauritania, but Mauritania soon ceded its claim to the territory, leaving Morocco as the only state belligerent. The war with Morocco caused about half of the Western Sahara's Sahrawi to flee the area, leaving a gap for Moroccan settlers to fill.

Role in the peace process 
Moroccan settlements have played a complex role in the resolution of the Western Sahara conflict.

Moroccan government support 
The Kingdom of Morocco supports the settlements financially and administratively, with many incentives given to citizens who choose to relocate to Western Sahara. For example, government employees that live in the Western Sahara earn roughly twice the amount that their colleagues in the rest of the Kingdom earn.

Polisario Front concerns 
The Polisario Front disagrees with the presence of settlers in the Western Sahara and sees them as a significant barrier to self-rule. In a 2018 conversation between Brahim Ghali, Secretary-General of the Polisario Front, and Horst Koehler, the United Nations Secretary-General's Personal Envoy to Western Sahara, Ghali noted that Moroccan settlements were a major area of concern. Specifically, the presence of settlers is significantly shifting the demographic makeup of the region, posing a significant roadblock to a resolution.

For the Polisario Front, Moroccan settlers now constituting the majority of the population of Western Sahara precludes the possibility of an independence referendum. Wary that any independence vote would either force a union with Morocco or continue Moroccan dominance over Western Sahara, few are open to such a referendum without decolonization and the repatriation of settlers to Morocco.

International responses 
The United Nations has attempted to mediate claims to the Western Sahara, with settlers being a major area of contention. In the early 2000s, UN Secretary General Kofi Annan's Personal Envoy to the Western Sahara, James Baker, held multiple meetings with Moroccan and Polisario officials to discuss the future of the Western Sahara. They were ultimately ineffective and inflamed relations. Baker also put forth two peace plans that would introduce a four-year phase of autonomy to the Western Sahara and then put independence to a referendum-style vote. At either point, either the Polisario Front or Morocco denied the plan.

Responses from other countries regarding settlers have been scarce. Though the United States Department of State, for example, has issued human rights reports for the Western Sahara, they have not made reference to settlers.

See also
Israeli settlement
Turkish settlers in Northern Cyprus

References

Western Sahara conflict
Settlement schemes in Africa
Ethnic groups in Western Sahara
Moroccan emigrants
Moroccan diaspora in Africa
Settlers